The 1999 Sacramento State Hornets football team represented California State University, Sacramento as a member of the Big Sky Conference during the 1999 NCAA Division I-AA football season. Led by fifth-year head coach John Volek, Sacramento State compiled an overall record of 6–5 with a mark of 3–5 in conference play, tying for fifth place in the Big Sky. The team outscored its opponents 414 to 310 for the season. The Hornets played home games at Hornet Stadium in Sacramento, California.

Schedule

Roster

Team players in the NFL
No Sacramento State players were selected in the 2000 NFL Draft.

The following finished their college career in 1999, were not drafted, but played in the NFL.

References

Sacramento State
Sacramento State Hornets football seasons
Sacramento State Hornets football